De la Independencia Aerodrome is an airport serving Rancagua, a city in the O'Higgins Region of Chile.

The airport is on the west side of the city. There is distant mountainous terrain east and west of the runway.

See also

Transport in Chile
List of airports in Chile

References

External links
OpenStreetMap - De la Independencia
SkyVector - Rancagua Airport

Airports in Chile
Airports in O'Higgins Region